Oxyptilus ericetorum is a moth of the family Pterophoridae. It is found in most of Europe (except Iceland, Ireland, Great Britain, the Benelux, Croatia, Hungary and Ukraine), east to Siberia.

The larvae feed on Hieracium pilosella and Hieracium murorum.

References

External links
Pterophoridae collection of Siberian Zoological Museum
Swedish Moths

Oxyptilini
Moths described in 1851
Plume moths of Europe
Moths of Asia